Eichrodt is a German surname. Notable people with the surname include:

 Hellmut Eichrodt (1872–1943), German painter and graphic artist
 Ike Eichrodt, American baseball player
 Ludwig Eichrodt, German poet
 Walther Eichrodt, German theologian and scholar

German-language surnames